John Whittington is an American screenwriter. He is best known for his collaborations with Jared Stern, including The Lego Batman Movie (2017) and The Lego Ninjago Movie (2017).

Career 
Whittington began his career by writing the screenplay for The Lego Batman Movie and The Lego Ninjago Movie. In July 2017, Whittington was hired to write the script for Boy21. In 2018, he wrote the screenplay for the Netflix film When We First Met. In 2019, he wrote two episodes of the animated series Green Eggs and Ham, based on the Dr. Seuss book of the same name. During reshoots, he rewrote the screenplay for the 2020 film Dolittle. He wrote the DC Comics film DC League of Super-Pets. He gained notability from co-writing the screenplay for the action adventure comedy film Sonic the Hedgehog 2.

Filmography

References

External links 
 

21st-century American male writers
21st-century American screenwriters
American male screenwriters
Living people
Place of birth missing (living people)
Year of birth missing (living people)